Emamzadeh Zualfaqar (also Romanized as Emāmzādeh Ẕūālfaqār and Emāmzādeh Ẕolfaqār) is a village in Hoseynabad-e Kordehha Rural District, in the Central District of Aradan County, Semnan Province, Iran. At the 2006 census, its population was 13, in 5 families.

References 

Populated places in Aradan County